Ilhéu das Rolas (also: Ilheu Gago Coutinho) is an islet in the African island nation of São Tomé and Príncipe. The island lies on the Equator, off the southern tip of São Tomé Island, separated by Canal das Rolas. Its population is 76 (2012 census). It is part of the Caué District. Access is only by ferry departing from Ponta Baleia on São Tomé Island. There is a lighthouse on the islet, built in 1929. The island is home to a small resort, the Pestana Equador.

History
The island was mentioned as "Illie de Rolle" in a 1665 map by Johannes Vingboons. and as "I. de Rolle" in a 1780 map by A. Dalrymple.

Gago Coutinho (1869–1959), officer of the Portuguese Navy, navigator and historian, headed a geodesic mission to São Tomé between 1915 and 1918, when marks were placed as a basis for a geodetic network in the archipelago. After that, observations for triangulation, precise base measurement and astronomical observations were made.

In the process, Gago Coutinho proved that Ilhéu das Rolas is crossed by the equatorial line. The resulting map was published in 1919, together with the Report of the Geodetic Mission on São Tomé Island 1915–1918, that was officially considered the first complete work of practical geodesy in the Portuguese colonies.

Nature
The islet is abundant in flora and fauna. Some endemic species are Greeff’s giant gecko, birds such as the São Tomé prinia and the São Tomé weaver and frogs such as Phrynobatrachus leveleve and Schistometopum thomense.

Gallery

References

 
Islands of São Tomé and Príncipe
Populated places in Caué District
Populated coastal places in São Tomé and Príncipe
Equator monuments